V8 Vegetable Juice, sometimes referred to as V8, is a trademarked name for a number of beverage products sold worldwide that are made from eight vegetables, or a mixture of vegetables and fruits. Since 1948, the brand has been owned by the Campbell Soup Company.

The original V8 vegetable juice was tomato-based and got its name from the fact that it contained juice from eight different vegetables.

V8 vegetable juice
The original V8 is a savory juice. It is made mainly from water and tomato concentrate, and reconstituted vegetable juice blend: water and concentrate of eight vegetables, specifically: beets, celery, carrots, lettuce, parsley, watercress, spinach, and tomato. Campbell's has produced several varieties of the drink, such as Original, Spicy Hot, Hint of Black Pepper, Lemon, Picante, Low-Sodium, and Organic.

Three spin-offs of the V8 brand, "V8 Energy", "V8 Splash" and "V8 V•Fusion", are blends of fruit and vegetable (specifically carrot) juices.  V8 Splash is a juice cocktail partially sweetened with high-fructose corn syrup and sucralose; diet versions of V8 Splash omit the high-fructose corn syrup. V8 Energy also classifies as a cocktail and is partially sweetened with sucralose. V•Fusion is made from 100% juice.

History

V8 Vegetable Juice was developed by Frank Constable of Chicago, Illinois, who worked as a contractor for W.G. Peacock (1896–1948), the founder of the New England Products Company, which manufactured individual vegetable juices under the brand name Vege-min since 1933.  Tomato juice made up around 87% of the original drink. In 1947, Frank Constable devised a new formula for the "Vege-min 8 Vegetable Cocktail Juice", which remains today. The product was named by Constable after the V8 engine, the most powerful at the time. In 1948, the Campbell Soup Company acquired the brand from the Charles Loudon Packing Company in Terre Haute, Indiana, and has maintained continuous production of the beverage through the present day.

Derivative beverages
A few cocktail drinks use V8, most famously the "bloody eight" or "eight ball", which is a Bloody Mary with V8 instead of tomato juice. Clamato, with a taste profile more savory than V8, is also common in variations.

V8 also markets a Bloody Mary Mix under its vegetable juice line. The composition is more traditional, using only tomato and lemon juices.

V8 Fruit & Vegetable Juice
Campbell's also makes sweet-flavored V8 100% Fruit & Vegetable Juice, combining vegetable juice with fruit juices for one serving of vegetables and one serving of fruits. This is available elsewhere as V8 V-Fusion.  They are also sold in "light" versions containing 50% juice (1/2 serving of vegetables and 1/2 serving of fruits) with added flavors to reduce calorie content. V8 V-Fusion + Tea was recently introduced.  It contains a 1/2 serving of vegetables and a 1/2 serving of fruits.

Some varieties are composed of:
Strawberry Banana: Sweet Potatoes, Tomatoes, Carrots, Beets, White Grapes, Oranges, Apples, Strawberries, Bananas and Banana Puree.
Pomegranate Blueberry: Sweet Potatoes, Purple Carrots, Tomatoes, Carrots, Apples, White Grapes.
Tropical Orange: Sweet Potatoes, Carrots, Yellow Tomatoes, Squash, White Grapes, Oranges, Pineapples.
Peach Mango: Sweet Potatoes, Yellow Tomatoes, Squash, White Grapes, Oranges, Peaches, Mangoes.
Açaí Mixed Berry: Sweet Potatoes, Carrots, Apples, White Grapes, Açaí Berries, Blueberries, Limes.
Cranberry Blackberry: Sweet Potatoes, Purple Carrots, Carrots, Apples, White Grapes, Cranberry, Blackberry, Lemon Juice.
Goji Raspberry: Sweet Potatoes, Purple Carrots, Carrots, Apples, White Grapes, Cherries, Strawberries, Blackberry, Oranges, Goji, Red Raspberry, Lemon Juice.

In Australia the V8 range includes 100% Fruit & Vegetable Juice, combining vegetable juice with fruit juices for one serving of vegetables and one serving of fruit, in the following flavors:⠀
Tropical 
Breakfast
Pineapple Passion 
Apple Mango 
Orange Mango Passion 

In 2015 the V8 Power Blend range was also launched in Australia, these 100% Vegetable Juice & Fruit juices contain 2 servings of vegetables are available in the following flavors:
Healthy Greens
Purple Power 
Orange Kick
Rainbow Burst 
Mighty Peach

V8 energy drinks
V8 also manufactures a line of juice-based energy drinks, sold in individual aluminum cans. Each includes 80 mg of caffeine (from green tea) per serving and is fortified with B vitamins. V8 Energy drinks are typically lower in sugar per fluid ounce compared to its juices, with the drinks partially sweetened with sucralose; other than caffeine, V8 Energy does not contain any of the various other stimulants (such as taurine, guarana, carnitine, inositol or glucoronolactone) found in other energy drinks.

Flavors include original (vegetable), black cherry, peach-mango, pomegranate-blueberry, orange-pineapple, raspberry-vanilla, strawberry-banana, honeycrisp apple-berry and tropical greens.
V8 +Energy Sparkling: A carbonated beverage of 34% juice, typically sold in  cans and -can four-packs. Currently produced flavors include Orange Pineapple, White Grape Raspberry, Black Cherry, Cranberry Blackberry and Kiwi Melon (the last two of which are only available in the four-packs).

Nutrition

Example nutrition information for V8 Vegetable Juice:

Slogans 
 "Wow, It Sure Doesn't Taste like Tomato Juice!"  (1960s)
 "Drink V8 & Keep Your Diet Straight!"  (1990s–present)
 "Drink Smarter with V8."  (2000–present)
 "Drink It. Feel It."  (2003–2004)
 "Should've Had a V8."  (1970s-1980s, 2009–present) ("Could've Had a V8."⠀ used in tandem)
 "Veg up." (present)

See also

 List of juices

References

External links

Vegetable juice
Campbell Soup Company brands
Products introduced in 1933